The Republic of South Ossetia – the State of Alania is a partially recognized state in the South Caucasus that declared independence from Georgia during the South Ossetia War (1991–1992). At the time, the Soviet Union had only just recently collapsed (in 1991). Since 1991, South Ossetia has sought recognition as a sovereign state from the international community. South Ossetia is considered by most of the international community to be a part of Georgia.

South Ossetia maintains relations with 5 United Nations (UN) member states and 4 other partially recognized states. These include: Russia, Nauru, Nicaragua, Syria, Venezuela, Abkhazia (also claimed by Georgia), Artsakh (claimed by Azerbaijan), the Sahrawi Arab Democratic Republic (self-declared state in the non-self-governing territory of Western Sahara), and Transnistria (claimed by Moldova). South Ossetia was central to the Russo-Georgian War (12 days in August 2008), alongside Abkhazia. Shortly after the war, Russia recognized South Ossetia (26 August 2008), the first UN member state to do so.

The Donetsk People's Republic and the Luhansk People's Republic arranged mutual recognition with South Ossetia in 2014, but they were annexed by Russia on 30 September 2022.

Relations with sovereign states and partially recognized states

Relations with subnational entities

Diplomatic missions

Offices in South Ossetia

Ossetian missions

Membership in international organizations 
As of March 2009, South Ossetia is a member of one international organization, the Community for Democracy and Human Rights.

See also 
 Foreign relations of Abkhazia

Notes

References

External links 
The Ministry of Foreign Affairs of the Republic of South Ossetia Website